Barrow-upon-Soar railway station serves the large village of Barrow-upon-Soar in Leicestershire, England.

History
The first station at Barrow was opened in 1840 by the Midland Counties Railway, which shortly joined the North Midland Railway and the Birmingham and Derby Junction Railway to form the Midland Railway.

It was originally known simply as Barrow, but became Barrow-upon-Soar in 1871. When Quorn and Woodhouse was opened by the rival Great Central Railway on the opposite (western) side of Quorn, it became Barrow-upon-Soar and Quorn in 1899. Neither station, in fact, was ideally located for Quorn being about equidistant from its centre.

Barrow was the only station on the line to retain much of its original MCR architecture. However it was completely demolished following its closure in 1968.

A new station was opened a little to the southeast of the original site on 27 May 1994 as part of phase one of the Ivanhoe Line.

In August 2016, a road bridge by the station partially collapsed during maintenance work, severely disrupting train services.

Stationmasters

T. Walker until 1860 (afterwards station master at Ullesthorpe)
Joseph Clementson 1861 - 1863 (afterwards station master at Brooksby)
A. Roberts from 1863 
William Grant ca. 1871 - 1873 (afterwards station master at Sharnbrook)
G. Welch 1873 - 1875 (formerly station master at Cudworth)
George Rivett 1875 - 1877 (formerly station master at Broughton)
J. Collins 1877 - 1881  (formerly station master at Hathern) 404
George Latimer 1881 - 1883 (formerly station master at Mountsorrel, afterwards station master at Glendon and Rushton)
Edward Presgrave 1883 - 1901 (formerly station master at Fiskerton)
H.F. West 1901 - 1903  (afterwards station master at Ketton)
William Dean 1903 - 1906 (formerly station master at Ketton, afterwards station master at Shirebrook)
Sidney William Varnam 1906 - ca. 1912 (formerly station master at old Dalby, afterwards station master at Pear Tree and Normanton)
Harry York ca. 1914 ca. 1931
Mr. Hill
Cuthbert Wells Towers 1942 - 1956 (formerly station master at Kirby Muxloe)
Ronald Frederick Short ca. 1957 ca. 1962

Facilities
The station is unstaffed and facilities are limited although there is a self-service ticket machine for ticket purchases as well as shelters and modern help points on both platforms. Bicycle storage is also available at the station.

Step-free access is not available to either of the platforms at the station.

Services
All services at Barrow-upon-Soar are operated by East Midlands Railway using Class 153, 156 and 158 DMUs.

The typical off-peak service in trains per hour is:
 1 tph to 
 1 tph to  via  of which 1 tp2h continues to 

Fast trains on the Midland Main Line pass by the station but do not stop.

The station is closed on Sundays.

Gallery

References

External links

Railway stations in Leicestershire
DfT Category F2 stations
Former Midland Railway stations
Railway stations in Great Britain opened in 1840
Railway stations in Great Britain closed in 1968
Railway stations opened by Railtrack
Railway stations in Great Britain opened in 1994
Railway stations served by East Midlands Railway
Reopened railway stations in Great Britain
Beeching closures in England